Ptyssoptera is a genus of moths in the family Palaephatidae.

Species
 Ptyssoptera acrozyga
 Ptyssoptera lativittella
 Ptyssoptera melitocoma
 Ptyssoptera phaeochrysa
 Ptyssoptera teleochra
 Ptyssoptera tetropa
 Ptyssoptera tryphera

References

Palaephatidae
Monotrysia genera